West Lake Restaurant is a restaurant in Changsha, capital of the central Chinese province of Hunan, and one of the largest restaurants in the world. With its 5,000 seats, it is considered the largest restaurant in China and in Asia, according to an entry in the Guinness Book of Records for being the biggest Chinese restaurant in the world. The restaurant has a seating capacity of 5,000 people.

History 
In 2000, the Xihulou restaurant was opened in the city of Liuyang, in early 2003, the construction of the new dining facility started in Changsha. After more than a year of construction, the new West Lake Restaurant opened in October 2004.

Location, service, and operations 
The restaurant complex is located 20 minutes from Changsha Huanghua International Airport, and covers an area of about 5.8 hectares. The numerous buildings were constructed in the traditional Chinese architectural style. The entire complex covers four different areas. Area A includes 70 large and small rooms, together with a performance hall, where daily shows take place. Area B comprises ten luxury private rooms in the style of Imperial Palaces. Area C has nine private luxury rooms, and area D is a "Snack Food Street". The restaurant mainly offers traditional Chinese dishes of Hunan cuisine and Cantonese cuisine. The restaurant employs a thousand people, including 300 chefs in five kitchens. Each week, approximately 700 chickens and 2,600 pounds of pork are used.

Publicity 
In May 2008, the BBC broadcast, as part of its Storyville documentary series, the four-part series entitled The Biggest Chinese Restaurant in the World, exploring the inner workings of the restaurant.

Gallery

See also
 List of restaurants in China

References

External links 

 Xihulou website

Restaurants in China
Buildings and structures in Changsha
Hunan cuisine
Cantonese cuisine
Chinese restaurants